Miguel "Mike" Barca (born January 30, 1954) is a retired American soccer goalkeeper who played professionally in the North American Soccer League, American Soccer League and Major Indoor Soccer League. 

Barca attended East Side High School in Newark, New Jersey and Fairleigh Dickinson University where he played on the men's soccer team from 1971 to 1974. He was a 1974 Honorable Mention (third team) All American and graduated in 1975 with a bachelor's degree in mathematics.  

Barca turned professional in 1975 with the Hartford Bicentennials of the North American Soccer League. In 1977, he joined the New Jersey Americans of the American Soccer League] where he played two seasons. In 1978, he signed with the Cleveland Force of Major Indoor Soccer League. Barca retired from professional soccer in 1980.  In April 1982, Monchik Weber hired Barca as a program manager.  In 1984, he moved to AT&T where he held a variety of management positions over the next twenty-two years.  He became an independent contractor in 2007.

References

External links
NASL stats
LinkedIn profile

1954 births
Living people
East Side High School (Newark, New Jersey) alumni
Soccer players from Newark, New Jersey
American soccer players
American Soccer League (1933–1983) players
Cleveland Force (original MISL) players
Fairleigh Dickinson Knights men's soccer players
Association football goalkeepers
Connecticut Bicentennials players
Major Indoor Soccer League (1978–1992) players
New Jersey Americans (ASL) players
North American Soccer League (1968–1984) players